Maria Eduardovna Artemyeva (born 11 March 1993) is a Russian former competitive figure skater. She is the 2013 Cup of Nice champion, 2015 Winter Universiade bronze medalist, and winner of four ISU Challenger Series medals.

Personal life 
Maria Eduardovna Artemyeva was born 11 March 1993 in Saint Petersburg, Russia.

Career

2008 to 2013 
In the 2008–09 season, Artemyeva made her junior international debut, taking the bronze medal at Cup of Nice, and competed on the senior level at the Russian Championships, finishing 10th. The following season, she placed 4th at the 2009 Junior Grand Prix in Zagreb, Croatia — the first and only JGP assignment of her career — and won the junior silver medal at Cup of Nice.

Making her senior international debut, Artemyeva placed 14th at the 2010 Golden Spin of Zagreb. After placing 12th at the 2011 Russian Championships, she was sent to her first Winter Universiade, where she finished 11th. Her first senior international medal, bronze, came at the 2011 Golden Spin of Zagreb and her first win at the 2013 International Cup of Nice.

2014–15 season
Artemyeva placed sixth in her ISU Challenger Series (CS) debut, at the Finlandia Trophy in October 2014. In November, making her Grand Prix (GP) debut, she placed 10th at the 2014 Rostelecom Cup and then 6th at the 2014 Trophée Éric Bompard. In December, she was awarded her first CS medal, silver, at the 2014 Golden Spin of Zagreb, having finished second to Finland's Kiira Korpi. Artemieva was 8th at the 2015 Russian Championships and ended her season with a bronze medal at the 2015 Winter Universiade, behind Alena Leonova and Maé-Bérénice Méité.

2015–16 to present 
Beginning the 2015–16 season on the CS series, Artemyeva obtained bronze medals at the 2015 Ondrej Nepela Trophy and 2015 Mordovian Ornament and silver at the 2015 Ice Challenge. She finished 11th at her GP assignment, the 2015 NHK Trophy.

The following season, she was invited to the 2016 Skate Canada International but withdrew in September.

Programs

Competitive highlights 
GP: Grand Prix; CS: Challenger Series; JGP: Junior Grand Prix

References

External links 
 

1993 births
Living people
Russian female single skaters
Universiade medalists in figure skating
Figure skaters from Saint Petersburg
Universiade bronze medalists for Russia
Competitors at the 2015 Winter Universiade
Competitors at the 2013 Winter Universiade
Competitors at the 2011 Winter Universiade